Kunzea parvifolia, commonly known as the violet kunzea, is a flowering plant in the myrtle family, Myrtaceae and is endemic to eastern Australia. It is a wiry shrub with small, narrow leaves and clusters of pink to purple flowers in spring.

Description
The leaves are linear to narrow lance-shaped and more or less pressed against the stem. The flowers are arranged in clusters of mostly three to eight on the ends of the branches.

Taxonomy and naming
Kunzea parvifolia was first formally described in 1844 by Johannes Conrad Schauer and the description was published in Johann Lehmann's Plantae Preissianae. The specific epithet (parvifolia) is derived from the Latin words parvus meaning "small" and folium meaning "leaf".

Distribution and habitat
This kunzea grows in forest in heath and forest in eastern New South Wales south from Torrington and in Victoria, mainly in the north-east but with isolated locations further west.

References

parvifolia
Flora of New South Wales
Flora of Queensland
Flora of Victoria (Australia)
Myrtales of Australia
Plants described in 1844